Coladenia buchananii is a species of spread-winged skipper butterflies. It is found in Myanmar, Thailand, Laos and China.

The length of the forewings is 22.5 mm for both males and females. The forewings are dark brown with white spots. The hindwings are dark brown, the basal area covered with hairs and the discal area with a series of black spots.

Subspecies
Coladenia buchananii buchananii (Myanmar, Thailand, Laos, China: north-western Yunnan)
Coladenia buchananii separafasciata Xue, Inayoshi & Hu, 2015 (southern Jiangxi, western Fujian)

Gallery

References

Pyrginae
Butterflies described in 1889
Butterflies of Asia
Taxa named by Lionel de Nicéville